Synaphe is a genus of snout moths described by Jacob Hübner in 1825.

Species

 Synaphe amuralis (Hampson, 1900)
 Synaphe antennalis (Fabricius, 1794)
 Synaphe berytalis (Ragonot in de Joannis & Ragonot, 1889)
 Synaphe biformis (Rothschild, 1915)
 Synaphe bombycalis (Denis & Schiffermüller, 1775)
 Synaphe bradleyalis (Viette, 1960)
 Synaphe chellalalis (Hampson, 1900)
 Synaphe diffidalis Guenée, 1854
 Synaphe dresnayi Leraut, 2005
 Synaphe fuscalis Amsel, 1966
 Synaphe fuscochralis Leraut, 2007
 Synaphe glaisalis (D. Lucas, 1933)
 Synaphe infumatalis (Erschoff, 1874)
 Synaphe interjunctalis (Guenée, 1849)
 Synaphe lorquinalis Guenée, 1854
 Synaphe moldavica (Esper, 1794)
 Synaphe morbidalis Guenée, 1849
 Synaphe oculatalis (Ragonot, 1885)
 Synaphe predotalis (Zerny, 1927)
 Synaphe punctalis (Fabricius, 1775)
 Synaphe rungsi (D. Lucas, 1937)
 Synaphe subolivalis (Oberthür, 1887)
 Synaphe testacealis (Rothschild, 1915)
 Synaphe unifascialis (Amsel, 1961)

References

Pyralini
Pyralidae genera
Taxa named by Jacob Hübner